Susana de Sousa Dias (born 22 January 1962, Lisbon, Portugal) is a Portuguese independent filmmaker.

Biography
After taking a degree at Lisbon Theatre and Film School she took on another degree course in Painting at Lisbon Fine Arts School where she graduated in 1991. In 2005 she received a M. Phil in Aesthetics and Philosophy of Art with a dissertation on Cinema, Archive and Memory that accompanied the making of her first long feature essay documentary film Natureza Morta (Still Life).  In 2014 she received a PhD in Fine-Arts Video from the University of Lisbon, with a thesis on Archive footage and Decelerated Movement, a theoretical work that accompanied the making her second long feature essay documentary 48.
 
She is co-founder of the film production company Kintop. From 2010-2012 she was a member of the board of the Portuguese Documentary Association APORDOC and in 2012 she formed a women's collective who directed for two consecutive years the Lisbon International Documentary Festival Doclisboa.  She engaged particularly in the creation of new sections of the festival such as "Cinema of Urgency" and "Passages" (Documentary and Contemporary Art).
One of most notorious aspects of her work is the artistic integration of archival footage dating from the Portuguese dictatorship (1926-1974).

Filmography and awards
A turning point in Susana de Sousa Dias' cinematographic work war her contact with the material gathered in archives of the Portuguese political police (Arquivo Pide/DGS) while preparing her documentary Processo-Crime 141-53 (Criminal-Case 141-53). The film was, at the same time, the starting point for questioning the role and the usage of archival footage in documentaries and history writing. 
The first film she made that can be considered as a direct reflection of the experience was Natureza Morta /Still Life (2005, 72", b/w), a Portuguese French co-production, only consisting of archive footage and sound, that deliberately renounced on the usage of spoken discourse. The film was awarded with the Merit Award at Taiwan Documentary Film Festival in 2006 and the Atalanta Films Award at Doclisboa 2006.
48 (2010) is her best known feature. On the film, Scott MacDonald writes: "Nearly all the images in De Sousa Dias’s remarkable third feature, 48, are extended close-ups of the mugshots of political prisoners during which we hear the political prisoners’ memories of the humiliations they endured. The visual challenge in 48 was how make a moving film from still photographs."  Susana de Sousa Dias developed an approach through montage which she calls a "montage within the shot" in "temporal depth".

For this film she was awarded several prizes such as the Grand Prix 2010 Cinéma du Réel, the FIPRESCI award at DOK Leipzig 2010, the Grand Prize 2011 at Mar del Plata International Independent Film Festival, Argentina; Special Mention 2011 Punto de Vista International Documentary Film Festival; Opus Bonum Award| for Best International Documentary, 2010, Jihlava International Documentary Film Festival; Don Quijote Award 2010 of the International Federation of Film Societies.

Besides her career as a film director, Susana de Sousa Dias works also in the field of visual arts. In 2010 she presented for the first time the installation in three screens and sound 5.1 Natureza Morta – Stilleben (2010) in the National Museum of Contemporary Art - Chiado Museum in Lisbon.
In 2017 she finished her film Luz Obscura / Obscure Light that was awarded with a Special Mention at the International Festival Documenta Madrid of the same year, for the "unique aesthetical and narrative approach". The film was later awarded with the Prix Spécial du Documentaire Historique  (les Rendez-vous de l'Histoire, Blois) and with the Best Sound Award at the Festival Caminhos do Cinema Português.

Her latest work Fordlandia Malaise (2019) premiered at the 69th edition of the Berlin International Film Festival.
Susana de Sousa Dias' works have also been shown in film festivals worldwide such as the Buenos Aires International Festival of Independent Cinema, Viennale, Visions du Réel, Sarajevo International Film Festival, Torino Film Festival, RIDMontreal, Dok Leipzig, Dockanema Maputo, Mar del Plata Independent Film Festival, among many others and in the context of contemporary arts exhibitions like PhotoEspaña (official selection 2011) and Documenta 14 (Keimena).

Teaching and writing
She teaches New Media at the Faculty of Fine Arts of the University of Lisbon and is an author of diverse essays on cinema, mainly dealing with subjects related to her own work, such as "(In)visible Evidence: the Representability of Torture" in A Companion to Contemporary Documentary Film, Wiley-Blackwell, 2015,  and "A sort of microscope of time: decelerated movement and archive footage" in Thinking Reality and Time through film, Cambridge Scholar Publishing, 2017.

She is regularly invited to present master classes or intervene in seminars and conferences in several art, film and teaching institutions, such as the Escuela Internacional de Cine y Televisión in Cuba, La Fémis in Paris, University of California Berkeley, São Paulo University, Université Paris 2, Pantéon-Sorbonne, Sciences-Po, Paris, etc.

References

Bibliography
Jacinto Lageira, Un entrelacement de poétiques, L'art comme histoire, Paris, Editions Mimésis, 2016.
Scott MacDonald, "Susana De Sousa Dias" in Avant-Doc: Intersections of Documentary and Avant-Garde Cinema, NY, Oxford University Press, 2015. 
Emília Tavares, The imprisoned Images: on Susana Sousa Dias’s 48 in Photography and Cinema: 50 Years of Chris Marker’s La Jetée.
Cristina Pratas Cruzeiro, "Susana de Sousa Dias’ 48: images that speak against themselves", n.paradoxa - international feminist art journal, volume 35, Jan 2015 
Horacio M. Fernández e Iván V. Álvarez, "Explorando la memoria traumática: Susana de Sousa Dias y el archivo salazarista" in Jugar con la memoria: El cine portugués en el siglo XXI, Santander, Shangrila Ed, 2014.;
Agnieszka Piotrowska, Psychoanalysis and Ethics in Documentary Film, London, NY, Routledge, 2013; 
Carolin Overhoff Ferreira, "Face a face com a ditadura: os filmes indisciplinares de Susana de Sousa Dias" in O Cinema Português, Aproximações à sua história e indisciplinaridade, São Paulo, 2013.
Laurent Véray, Les images d’archives face à l’histoire. De la conservation à la création, Chasseneuil-du-Poitou/Paris, Éd. scérén, cndp-crdp, 2011.
Stéphanie Benzaquen, Behind bars: Artistic appropriation of prisoners’ headshots in the works of Susana de Sousa Dias, Binh Danh and Clarisse Hahn, Kunstlicht, jrg 32 - n.4, pp. 24 – 33, The Nederlands, 2011.
Charlotte Garson, 48 de Susana de Sousa Dias, Images Documentaires, 67-68, France, 2010 
Amalia Liakou, "Antinomie de la photographie du corps politique: Susana de Sousa Dias", Politique de la Photographie du Corps, Les Editions Klincksieck, Paris, 2011.

1962 births
Living people
Portuguese cinematographers
Portuguese documentary film directors
University of Lisbon alumni
Academic staff of the University of Lisbon
Lisbon Theatre and Film School alumni